Ashleigh Clare-Kearney, (born April 7, 1986) is a two-time NCAA champion, who competed for the LSU Lady Tigers gymnastics team.

NCAA career
Clare-Kearney was the 2009 NCAA champion in the vault and floor exercises.

Coaching career
Clare-Kearney is a volunteer assistant coach for the LSU Lady Tigers gymnastics team.

References

American female artistic gymnasts
LSU Tigers women's gymnasts
LSU Tigers women's gymnastics coaches
Living people
1986 births
Sportspeople from Manchester, Connecticut
African-American female gymnasts
21st-century African-American sportspeople
21st-century African-American women
20th-century African-American people
20th-century African-American women
NCAA gymnasts who have scored a perfect 10